Clemensia quinqueferana is a moth of the family Erebidae first described by Francis Walker in 1863. It is found in Mexico, Panama and Tefé, Brazil.

References

Cisthenina
Moths described in 1863